The 2005–06 season was the first for both the Central Coast Mariners and the A-League

Compared with its Sydney rival, the Central Coast Mariners had a far more low-key buildup to the inaugural A-League season. The majority of its squad were experienced players from the defunct National Soccer League. They generally exceeded most expectations, having a very successful season, culminating in two solid displays in the preliminary competitions and reaching the grand final in the A-League.

Players

First team squad

Short term cover
Short term cover
Short term cover
Short term cover
Short term cover

Matches

2005-06 Pre-season fixtures

Phillips International Soccer Sevens
The Mariners competed in Phillips International soccer sevens tournament played in Hong Kong. Their group featured three of the biggest teams in the world, PSV, Manchester United and Celtic. The Mariners caused one of the upsets of the tournament by defeating a somewhat understrength Manchester United 2–1.

Club World Cup Qualification Competition
The Mariners were runners-up to Sydney FC in the qualifying tournament held to determine Australia's entry in the FIFA Club World Cup, losing in the grand final 1–0.

2005 Pre-Season Cup
Group B

2005-06 A-League fixtures

2005-06 Finals series

Ladder

Finals

Statistics

Goal scorers

End of Year Awards
 Mariners Medallist - player of the year, as voted by Club members:
 Michael Beauchamp
 Chairman's Award - awarded for outstanding service to the club:
 John Hutchinson and Ben Coonan (Mariners' media officer) (shared)
 Golden Boot (top goalscorer):
 Stewart Petrie
 Jesters' Pies Marinators' Goal of the Year:
 Noel Spencer, round 1 vs Perth Glory
 Central Coast Mariners Members Player of the Year Award:
 Andre Gumprecht'''

References

External links
 Official website

2005-06
2005–06 A-League season by team